EW Viljoen (born 9 May 1995 in Bloemfontein, South Africa) is a South African rugby union player playing for the Johannesburg based . He is a utility back that can play as a fullback, winger or centre.

Career

Youth

Viljoen was noticed at primary school level, when he was selected in the Free State squad for the Under-13 Craven Week tournament in 2008. He then went to Grey College in Bloemfontein, where he was called up to a number of youth tournaments.

This led to Viljoen's inclusion in the South African Schools side for the 2013 international series, where he started two matches to help the South African side to victories over England and France.

At the end of 2013, he moved to Cape Town to join . He was one of the Western Province Rugby Institute players that were invited to form part of the  wider training group prior to the 2014 Super Rugby season.

Western Province

Leicester Tigers

On 2 July 2019, English Premiership Rugby side Leicester Tigers announced the signing of Viljoen ahead of the 2019–20 season.

Lions/Golden Lions
On 14 July 2020, Vijoen returns to South Africa to sign for Lions back into the Super Rugby competition. He will also play for Golden Lions in the Currie Cup and Vodacom Cup competitions.

South Africa Under-20

In March 2015, Viljoen was named in an extended South Africa Under-20 training group as part of their preparation for the 2015 World Rugby Under 20 Championship. He didn't feature in a friendly match against a Varsity Cup Dream Team or their two-match tour of Argentina, but was included in the final squad for the 2015 World Rugby Under 20 Championship.

He wasn't named in the squad for their 33–5 win against hosts Italy in the first of their three matches in Pool B of the competition and was an unused replacement in their next match, a 40–8 win against Samoa. He started their final match, a 46–13 win over Australia to help South Africa finish top of Pool B to qualify for the semi-finals with the best record pool stage of all the teams in the competition. Viljoen started their semi-final match against England, but could not prevent them losing 20–28 to be eliminated from the competition by England for the second year in succession and also started their third-place play-off match against France, helping South Africa to a 31–18 win to secure third place in the competition.

Cricket

Viljoen was also a cricketer at school and was called up to various Free State youth cricket teams.

References

South African rugby union players
Living people
1995 births
Rugby union players from Bloemfontein
Rugby union centres
Rugby union wings
Rugby union fullbacks
Western Province (rugby union) players
South Africa Under-20 international rugby union players
Leicester Tigers players
Stormers players
Lions (United Rugby Championship) players
Golden Lions players